Cape Lloyd is a cape which forms the north end of Clarence Island in the South Shetland Islands of Antarctica, on the north side of the entrance to Kutela Cove. The name "Lloyd's Promontory" appears on charts of the 1821–25 period, but in more recent years the feature has become internationally known as Cape Lloyd.

See also
 List of lighthouses in Antarctica

References

Headlands of the South Shetland Islands
Lighthouses in Antarctica